Avenida de los Insurgentes, sometimes known simply as Insurgentes, is the longest avenue in Mexico City, with a length of  on a north-south axis across the city. Insurgentes has its origins in what was during the early 20th century known as the Via del Centenario which ran from city centre to the southern suburbs.

Many decades later, after it was paved and widened, its name was changed to Avenida de los Insurgentes, apparently happening during the administration of President Miguel Alemán, when the area attracted wealthy urbanites for sophisticated, modern housing.
The avenue was named after the Insurgent Army (Ejército de los Insurgentes) that fought for Mexican independence from Spain during the Mexican War of Independence from 1810 to 1821.

The avenue's southern terminus is located near Volcán Ajusco in the intersection with the Viaducto Tlalpan avenue, where it becomes Highway 95 in direction to Cuernavaca. The northern terminus is located in the intersection with Avenida Acueducto where it becomes the highway to Pachuca.

The avenue crosses five of the 16 boroughs of the city. Many of Mexico City's emblematic colonias (such as Condesa, Roma, Del Valle, Napoles, San Ángel, Pedregal) are either crossed or on the side of Insurgentes. The Mexico City Metrobús bus rapid transit system, opened in 2005, runs along the avenue, from Tlalpan to Metro Indios Verdes.

Notable locations
From north to south:
Monumento a La Raza
Buenavista railway station
 Intersection with Paseo de la Reforma – Monument to Cuauhtémoc
 Insurgentes 300, a mid-century modern tower
World Trade Center Mexico City – located next to the Polyforum Cultural Siqueiros. It is one of the tallest buildings in the city with 52 floors. It has its own conference center and shopping mall.
Teatro de los Insurgentes – important theater built in 1953 by José María Dávila
Torre Mural and Centro Insurgentes shopping mall
San Ángel historic center
Torre Murano
Ciudad Universitaria (C.U.) –the main campus of the National Autonomous University of Mexico. The speed limit in this zone is 40 mph.
Cuicuilco – the ancient village of the Cuicuilcas who used to live in what is today southern part of the city, just 1 km away from the campus. Xitle Volcano destroyed the city circa 1100BC. It remains the Imán pyramid.

Along with a myriad of skyscrapers, several shopping malls line the boulevard, including Perisur, Galerías Insurgentes, Centro Insurgentes, the one at World Trade Center Mexico City, Galerías Insurgentes, and Forum Buenavista.

Throughout its span, Insurgentes crosses several ejes viales as well as the Circuito Interior and Anillo Periférico highway rings twice.

Public transportation
Mexico City Metrobús Line 1, inaugurated in 2005, runs on Avenida de los Insurgentes for 28.1 km, almost all of the avenue's length, from Indios Verdes to El Caminero.

Metro
Several Mexico City Metro stations are also located on Avenida de los Insurgentes, most notably the Insurgentes station of Line 1, at the Glorieta de los Insurgentes.

Metro stations
Indios Verdes 
Deportivo 18 de Marzo  
Potrero 
La Raza  
Buenavista 
Revolución 
Insurgentes 
Chilpancingo 
Insurgentes Sur

References

External links
 Brief description of the avenue.

Streets in Mexico City
Benito Juárez, Mexico City
Cuauhtémoc, Mexico City
Edge cities in Mexico
Shopping districts and streets in Mexico